Boris Erasmus Palmer (born 28 May 1972) is a German politician and former member of the Green Party. He has been mayor of Tübingen since January 2007. From March 2001 to May 2007, he was a member of the Baden-Württemberg Landtag, the State parliament in Stuttgart.

Palmer's controversial positions have cost him the support of his party in the 2020 municipal elections, and a process to oust him from party ranks was started the following year.

Background 
Palmer was born in Waiblingen, Baden-Württemberg. His father, Helmut, dubbed Remstalrebell ("Rems-valley rebel") was a very well known and controversial figure and perennial candidate. In a Deutsche Welle interview for the  program Talking Germany with Peter Craven, Palmer described his father as a rebel who became a political activist in the 1950s, when "all the old fascists, all the old Nazis were back" in power, and said that his grandfather was a Jew who had to flee to the United States in 1938. The former state minister and CDU member Christoph Palmer is a second nephew of Helmut and a second cousin of Boris Palmer.

Palmer graduated from high school (Abitur) at the Steiner School in Winterbach-Engelberg in 1992. From 1993, Palmer studied history and mathematics at the University of Tübingen and in Sydney. In 1996, he joined the Green Party.

Career 
After graduating from Tübingen in 1999 Palmer worked as a scientific assistant for the Green Party in the Bundestag, the German Federal parliament, in Berlin.

In March 2001 he won a seat in the Landtag of Baden-Württemberg and was appointed party spokesman for environmental and transportation issues.
 
In 2004 he ran for the office of mayor of Stuttgart, finishing in third place in the first round ballot at 21.5% of votes, a better result than all previous Green candidates for mayor of Stuttgart. He withdrew his candidacy before the second round ballot with an indirect recommendation that his followers should vote for the incumbent mayor Wolfgang Schuster on condition that Schuster would hold a referendum on the controversial project Stuttgart 21, which Palmer is opposed to, if costs would increase significantly. Even though that has been the case, Schuster has not kept that promise.

After being re-elected to the Landtag in March 2006, Palmer decided in July to run as mayor of Tübingen and won the election on 22 October with 50.4% of the vote. He subsequently resigned from his Landtag mandate after taking office in January 2007.

In July 2009, Palmer was criticized for recommending antizionist activist and Tübingen resident Felicia Langer for the Federal Cross of Merit.

Palmer was a Green Party delegate to the Federal Convention for the purpose of electing the president of Germany in 2010. In March 2011, the Greens won the Baden-Württemberg state election: after decades, the CDU lost its power. Since then, Minister-President of Baden-Württemberg is a Greens politician, Winfried Kretschmann.

In November 2012, after Palmer had been critical of child adoption by homosexual couples and criticism about him being not much of a team player, the central Green party council did not reelect him. On 19 October 2014, Palmer was reelected for another eight-year term.  Palmer's relatively conservative stance within the Greens is well known and he has been deemed as controversial in the party.  His use of Facebook, e.g. with regard to a landlord that was not willing to serve drinks on inn's terrace, has caused some conflicts and doubts about his diplomatic skills.

As a result of repeated accusations of racism against Boris Palmer, the Green Party of Baden-Württemberg initiated party order proceedings against him at a digital party conference on 8 May 2021. The aim of the proceedings is to expel Palmer from the party. On 15 November 2021, the state executive of the Green Party of Baden-Württemberg officially applied for Palmer's expulsion from the party.

After being dismissed from the Green Party, Boris Palmer ran the 2022 Tübingen Mayor Election as an independent candidate. He won the election with a clear majority by securing 52 % of votes.

Politics 
Palmer initiated a project for a light rail through the old town of Tübingen. He declared it the main part of his policy for a different traffic policy ("Verkehrswende"). The municipal council and the university also backed the project. However, in a referendum, 57.39 percent of Tübingen citizens voted against the inner-city route in summer 2021.

Positions

Immigration 
In late 2015, Palmer was heavily criticized by other members of the Green Party, as well as by the party's youth organization, for his relatively right-wing positions on refugee immigration. In August 2017, some weeks before the German federal election, Palmer published the book "We cannot help everyone", .

COViD-19 
On 5 May 2020, The New York Times reported that "Boris Palmer, the mayor of Tübingen, in the country's southwest, suggested that reviving the economy mattered more than the lives of potential coronavirus victims, whom he characterized as old and unwell. “Let me be blunt: In Germany, we might be saving people who would be dead in half a year anyway,” he said in a TV interview last Tuesday."

Opinion poll 
Palmer's candidacy in 2022 is based, among other things, on a survey in Tübingen, according to which the citizens want him back as mayor. The survey was carried out among 500 people from Tübingen in October 2021, shortly after the federal elections. Various topics were queried in it, the question about Palmer was only one.

In February 2022, Palmer admitted to DLF that he commissioned the survey at the time. he also paid for them himself, he said.

Other activities
 Max Planck Institute for Biological Cybernetics, Member of the Board of Trustees
 Max Planck Institute for Intelligent Systems, Member of the Board of Trustees

References 

1972 births
Living people
People from Waiblingen
Alliance 90/The Greens politicians
Mayors of places in Baden-Württemberg
University of Tübingen alumni
Waldorf school alumni
Members of the Landtag of Baden-Württemberg
German people of Jewish descent
Knights of the Ordre national du Mérite
People from Tübingen